Bridgeland may refer to:

Places
 Bridgeland Community, a community in Harris County, Texas, United States
 Bridgeland, Calgary, a neighbourhood in Calgary, Alberta
 Bridgeland, Utah, an unincorporated community in Duchesne County, Utah, United States.

Other uses
 Bridgeland (surname)
 Bridgeland/Memorial (C-Train), C-Train station in Calgary, Alberta, Canada